The Australian pre-decimal halfpenny coin, commonly known as a ha’penny (pronounced /ˈheɪpəni/), was the smallest denomination of the Australian Pound in circulation. It was a unit of currency that equalled half of a penny, 1/24 of a shilling or 1/480 of a pound. The coin was made to be equivalent to the British halfpenny; its dimensions, composition and values were equivalent, and additionally, the two currencies were fixed at par.

The coin was first introduced in 1911, and minting ceased in 1965 with the introduction of the decimal system. When decimalisation occurred on 14 February 1966, the coin value was made equivalent to 5/12 c (= 0.41666 c).

The obverse of the coin featured the current reigning monarch of Australia (excluding 1936 when Edward VIII was King). Three monarchs were featured; King George V, King George VI, and Queen Elizabeth II. All halfpennies produced with George VI and Elizabeth II had the Kangaroo Reverse.

Australian Halfpennies were minted at different locational, nationally and internationally over the years from 1911 to 1964. Within Australia, halfpennies were minted in Melbourne, Perth and Sydney. Internationally, they were minted in India (Calcutta and Bombay), and England (London and Birmingham), each signified by different mint marks.

History

King George V (1911–1936) 
After the death of King Edward VII in 1910, George V became King of the United Kingdom, British Denominations and Emperor of India. His Coronation was held on 5 May 1910. Subsequently, coins minted for Australia by the Royal Mint, London, and dated 1911, were altered on the obverse only. Bronze halfpennies (and pennies) were issued for the first time this year.

King George V Australian halfpennies feature him robed and crowned on the obverse, facing to the left and from bust up. The regal visage of George V "graces the vast majority of Australia’s rarest and most desirable Commonwealth coins."

The reverse has the words "ONE HALF PENNY" in three lines at the centre, surrounded by a beaded circle. A small scroll is under the word "PENNY" within the beaded circle. The legend "COMMONWEALTH OF AUSTRALIA" with date surrounds the circle of beads.

In 1936, Edward VIII was King from 20 January, until he abdicated that same year, on 11 December. During this year, all Australian coins continued to bear the bust of George V.

King George VI (1938–1952) 
On 11 December 1936, George VI came to the throne on the abdication of his elder brother Edward VIII.

Pattern halfpennies bore the Kangaroo Reverse for the first time in 1937. From 1938, this new reverse appeared on circulation halfpennies thereafter. In 1939, there were two different types of the reverse struck—one of the previous "Commonwealth of Australia" design reverse with "ONE HALF PENNY", and the other with the new Kangaroo reverse.

In 1942 and 1943, Australian halfpennies were struck in Melbourne and India.

From 1944 to 1951, the Melbourne and Perth Mint struck halfpennies. In 1951, the London mint also struck halfpennies with the mintmark "PL".

In 1952, halfpennies were solely struck by the Perth mint, with a dot after the word "Australia".

Queen Elizabeth II (1953–1964) 
From 1953 to 1964, the Perth Mint struck all of Australia's halfpennies, excluding 1959 (when they were struck by the Melbourne Mint). In 1953, the Perth Mint situated a mintmark dot after "Australia", whereas from 1960 to 1964, they placed the dot after the word "halfpenny".

Types

Mint and mintage by year 

Counting the known mintages of proofs, a total of 422,882,890 (422 million) coins of the denomination were minted during its circulation.

Above tabulated information derived from, and corroborated between sources .

Numismatics

1916I Mule ~ valued up to AUD $100,000 – $125,000  

The 1916I Mule carries the standard Australian reverse for halfpennies of 1916, however, it is distinguishable by its obverse, which is that of an Indian Quarter Anna coin. It is Australia's rarest Commonwealth coin issued for circulation, and when its significance was first recognised in the Australian numismatic press in the mid 1960s, it was described as the "biggest find in coin history, and one of the most valuable." There are currently 5 known specimens in existence, and it is predicted that there are 6–10 examples in existence.

The historical context of how the Indian Quarter Anna obverse came onto 1916 Halfpenny, is that during WWI the Royal Mint of London assigned the production of a range of Australian coins to the Calcutta Mint. The reason for this change was that there were allay concerns that the German Navy could have the ability to intercept or sink maritime deliveries of coinage from Britain to Australia. This would not have only had the consequence of expense, but would have also been morale-shattering in a time of great need. The 1916 Australian halfpenny and penny were the first non-Indian coins to be produced by the Royal Mint's Calcutta branch.

It is to be noted that the Calcutta Mint had been successfully producing copper Annas and silver Rupees since 1862, so the mint had the resources, systems and experience to produce this new coin. It is still subject to debate how the error of the 1916I Mule Halfpenny came into existence.

This coin, like any numismatic item, is sought after by collectors for a variety of reasons. It appeals to collectors for its rarity, being a crucial component in creating a truly complete Australian Commonwealth coin set, its historical numismatic significance, and being topic of continued debate.

1923 ~ valued up to AUD $75,000 – $100,000  

In 1922, the Royal Mint’s Sydney Branch manufactured sixpence and halfpenny coins for the Commonwealth. These coins were produced using dies supplied from the Melbourne Mint. In 1923, the future of the Sydney Mint was uncertain (eventually closing in 1926) which led to 1923 dies not being sent to Sydney, leaving the entire issues from Sydney for that year—some 1,113,600 coins—being struck baring the incorrect date of 1922. This meant that in July 1923, the Melbourne Mint received an order to produce £1000 of halfpenny coins (equating to 480,000 coins).

Three pairs of 1923 dies were issued from the Melbourne workshop in September of that year. However, all three of these dies failed in early stages—one was immediately returned to the workshop for amendments, and the remaining two cracked early in production. This resulted in the rarity of 1923 halfpenny coins.

1939 ~ valued up to AUD $25,000 – $35,000  

In 1939, the first halfpenny coins continued to be produced with the long-standing  "•COMMONWEALTH OF AUSTRALIA•" which had held since their first introduction 1911.  However, later that year the reverse changed to a scaled-down and horizontally inverted version of the penny Kangaroo reverse, which was introduced the previous year in 1938. Furthermore, there were two observably distinct reverse Kangaroo dies on the (then) new 1939 halfpennies—one from the original London die master and the second from the Melbourne Mint.

There are a number of features on the 1939 Kangaroo reverse coins that allow the two types to be distinguished. The most notable difference in marking is observable when comparing the foot of the "Y" in "HALFPENNY"—the rarer of which presents a double foot, while the more common version displays a single foot. The Australian Numismatic Dealers Association regards the double foot 1939 halfpenny as an "extremely rare coin in uncirculated condition."

References

External links 

Coins from Australia / Coin Type: Halfpenny - Online Coin Club
Half Penny | Blue Sheet
Australia halfpennies
1942 Long reverse denticles variety

Coins of Australia
1911 establishments in Australia
1964 disestablishments in Australia